High Tove is a fell in the English Lake District, close to the geographical centre of the Cumbrian hills. It forms part of the watershed between the Derwentwater and Thirlmere catchments, a ridge running broadly north-south.

Topography
Sitting astride the spine of the Central Fells, High Tove is an outlier of High Seat. It is separated from its taller northern neighbour by the Pewits, an extremely boggy depression. The ridge moves on south across further upland marsh towards Ullscarf, passing over the three rocky (and dry) outcrops of Middle Crag, Shivery Knott and Watendlath Fell (summit unnamed on Ordnance Survey maps). Armboth Fell lies to the south east of High Tove, connected to the ridge by a broad heathery saddle.

High Tove covers around one and a half miles of the north-south ridge, which is approximately a mile in width. It is bounded on the west by Watendlath Gill and its main feeder, Blea Tarn Gill. These flow to Watendlath Tarn, a popular beauty spot. The tarn is available for private fishing, being well stocked with trout. It holds a wide selection of flora, including water lilies and is at least 50 ft deep. Fisher and Launchy Gills provide the eastern boundaries of High Tove, flowing north and south around Armboth Fell respectively. Both are feeders of Thirlmere.

Geology
The summit is an island outcrop of the Thirlmere Member in a sea of drift deposits. The Thirlmere Member comprises welded rhyodacitic tuff with breccia.

Ascents
A bridleway provides the pass from Watendlath to Armboth crossing the ridge. Unusually it keeps to the summit  rather than a depression, in an attempt to avoid wet ground. A further path runs along the watershed, accompanied by a wire fence. This can prove useful for crossing the worst of the bogs.

Summit
The top has a large cairn, which in Wainwright's words offers a seat to travellers who wish to pour the water out of their boots.

The views are good to the either side, the Helvellyn range nearby to the east and a wide selection of major fells visible on the opposite flank of the ridge. Higher neighbours obstruct the view to north and south.

References

Fells of the Lake District